The Hippoglossoidinae are a subfamily of fish in the family Pleuronectidae. The name is derived from the Ancient Greek words hippos, "horse", glossa, "tongue", and eidos, "form, likeness".

Genera
 Acanthopsetta
 Cleisthenes
 Hippoglossoides

Pleuronectidae
Fish subfamilies